Nihaduzzaman (born 28 November 1998) is a Bangladeshi cricketer. He made his Twenty20 debut for Rajshahi Kings on 4 November 2017 in the 2017–18 Bangladesh Premier League. He was the joint-leading wicket-taker in the 2017–18 National Cricket League tournament, with 21 dismissals.

Career
He was added to the squad of Bangladesh U-19 team for 2014 Under-19 Cricket World Cup.

In October 2018, he was named in the squad for the Chittagong Vikings team, following the draft for the 2018–19 Bangladesh Premier League.

Accidents and injuries
In 2015, while travelling towards Rajshahi to play for the Rajshahi division he suffered severe injuries on head and skull on a road accident when two busses collided. But he returned to cricket later in the same year.
In 2017, his hand was broken when a ball hit his hand and after recovering from the injury he again returned to cricket in 2019.

References

External links
 

1998 births
Living people
Bangladeshi cricketers
People from Rajshahi District
Kala Bagan Krira Chakra cricketers
Old DOHS Sports Club cricketers
Rajshahi Royals cricketers
Chattogram Challengers cricketers